Penstemon canescens is a species of penstemon in the family Plantaginaceae.  P. canescens is known by the common names Eastern gray beardtongue or Appalachian beardtongue. It is native to woodlands, forest edges, and roadsides of the southeastern United States and flowers May through July. It is a perennial herb producing stems reaching one meter in maximum height. Penstemon canescens has been used by Native Americans for thousands of years.

Description 
Penstem canescens is an erect, herbaceous perennial 1-2 1/2 ft. tall with 1 to many unbranched, pubescent stems.  Leaves are sessile, oblong, toothed, and hairy.  Basal leaves are more broad.  Pinkish-purple, pale purple, or violet flowers appear in a terminal panicle.  The corolla is tubular with 2 lips, the upper lip is 2-lobed while the lower lip is 3-lobed.  The throat of the corolla is white with a purple stripe.

References

External links 
USwildflowers.com

canescens
Flora of the Southeastern United States
Flora of the Appalachian Mountains
Flora of Virginia